Danhatchia australis is a species of terrestrial orchid, lacking chlorophyll and obtaining nutrients from fungi in the soil. It is native to New Zealand (both main islands) and to New South Wales.

References

External links
New Zealand Native Orchids, Danhatchia australis 
New Zealand Plant Conservation Network, Danhatchia australis
PlantNET New South Wales Flora Online, Danhatchia australis 
Panoramio photo of Danhatchia australis in Australia
Retired Aussies, Danhatchia australis

Myco-heterotrophic orchids
Goodyerinae
Orchids of New South Wales
Orchids of New Zealand
Plants described in 1963